Ciocârlia, (meaning "skylark"), in the past sometimes spelled ciocîrlia, may refer to:

 Ciocârlia (lăutăresc tune), a Romanian traditional tune
 Fanfare Ciocărlia, a Romani (Gypsy) brass band from Romania
 Ciocârlia (film), a 2002 Romanian TV film
 Ciocârlia (ensemble), a Romanian folk music and dance ensemble that belonged to the Ministry of the Interior

Places 
 Ciocârlia, Constanța, a commune in Constanța County
 Ciocârlia, Ialomița, a commune in Ialomița County
 Ciocârlia, a tributary of the Miloveanu in Olt County, Romania
 Ciocârlia, a tributary of the Șușița in Vrancea County, Romania

People
Dana Ciocarlie (born 1968), French pianist and teacher of music of Romanian origin